Glidin' Along is an album by American trombonist Bennie Green recorded in 1961 and released on the Jazzland label.

Reception

The Allmusic review awarded the album 3 stars.

Track listing
All compositions by Bennie Green except where noted.
 "African Dream" - 5:45  
 "Sweet Sucker" (Johnny Griffin) - 8:00  
 "Glidin' Along" (Babs Gonzales) - 5:08  
 "Green's Scene" (Gonzales, Green) - 8:27  
 "Milkshake" (Griffin) - 3:59  
 "Stardust" (Hoagy Carmichael, Mitchell Parish) - 4:13  
 "Expubidence" (Gonzales) - 3:59

Recorded in New York City on March 9 (tracks 2, 3, 6 & 7) and March 22 (tracks 1, 4 & 5), 1961.

Personnel
Bennie Green - trombone
Johnny Griffin - tenor saxophone  
Junior Mance - piano
Paul Chambers (tracks 2, 3, 6 & 7), Larry Gales (tracks 1, 4 & 5) - bass
Ben Riley - drums

References 

Jazzland Records albums
Bennie Green albums
1961 albums
Albums produced by Orrin Keepnews